Stoyan Todorov (Bulgarian: Стоян Тодоров; born 9 August 1982) is a Bulgarian retired professional footballer who played as a midfielder.

References

External links
Guardian's Stats Centre

1982 births
Living people
Bulgarian footballers
FC Sportist Svoge players
First Professional Football League (Bulgaria) players
Association football midfielders
People from Svoge
Sportspeople from Sofia Province